Nanjing−Wuhu railway or Ningwu railway, is a single-track railroad in eastern China between Nanjing in Jiangsu Province and Wuhu in Anhui Province. Major towns along route include Nanjing, Ma'anshan, and Wuhu.

Line Description
The line follows the southern bank of the Yangtze River from Nanjing to Wuhu.  In 1968, the line was extended further west to Tongling, and now forms part of the Nanjing–Tongling railway.  The railway passes through urban areas of Nanjing and is now being rerouted to run outside of the city.  The old track is now being converted into Line 8 of the Nanjing Metro.

See also
 List of railways in China

References

Railway lines in China
Rail transport in Anhui
Rail transport in Jiangsu